Vankampen's gecko (Nactus vankampeni) is a species of lizard in the family Gekkonidae. The species is endemic to New Guinea.

Etymology
The specific name, vankampeni, is in honor of Dutch herpetologist Pieter Nicolaas van Kampen.

Geographic range
On the island of New Guinea, N. vankampeni is found in Indonesia and northeastern Papua New Guinea.

Habitat
The preferred natural habitat of N. vankampeni is forest.

Reproduction
N. vankampeni is oviparous.

References

Further reading
Brongersma L (1933). "A new Gecko of the Genus Gymnodactylus from New Guinea". Annals and Magazine of Natural History, Tenth Series 11: 252–253. (Gymnodactylus vankampeni, new species).
Jackman TR, Bauer AM, Greenbaum E (2008). "Phylogenetic relationships of Geckos of the genus Nactus and their relatives (Squamata: Gekkonidae)". Acta Herpetologica 3 (1): 1–18.
Rösler H, Glaw F, Günther R (2005). "Aktualisierte Liste der Geckos von Neuguinea (Sauria: Gekkonidae: Gekkoninae) mit vorläufiger Charakterisierung von neun Formen aus den Gattungen Cyrtodactylus Gray, 1827, Gehyra Gray, 1834 und Nactus Kluge, 1983 ". Gekkota 5: 33–64. (Nactus vankampeni, p. 48). (in German, with an abstract in English).

Nactus
Endemic fauna of New Guinea
Reptiles of Papua New Guinea
Reptiles of Western New Guinea
Taxa named by Leo Brongersma
Reptiles described in 1933
Geckos of New Guinea